Dourado may refer to:

 Dourado (grape), another name for the Portuguese wine grape Loureira
 Dourado (Salminus), a predatory freshwater fish
 Dourado, São Paulo, Brazil
 Golden dourado (Salminus brasiliensis), a freshwater fish
 Henrique Dourado (born 1989), Brazilian football player
 The nickname of the Brazilian football team Cuiabá Esporte Clube
 Dourados, Mato Grosso do Sul, Brazil

See also 
 
 Dorado (disambiguation)